Kępy may refer to the following places in Poland:
Kępy, Lower Silesian Voivodeship (south-west Poland)
Kępy, West Pomeranian Voivodeship (north-west Poland)